Chudów  (German Chudow also Chutow) is a village in the district of Gliwice County, within the municipality of Gmina Gierałtowice, Silesian Voivodeship, in the historical region of Silesia. The village has a population of 1,493 (2012).

History

The village was first mentioned in 1295 as Chudow attested in the Latin manuscript Liber fundationis episcopatus Vratislaviensis. Chudów was a privately owned medieval manor purchased in 1532 by the Roman-German Silesian nobility House of Saszowski family, who already owned the neighbouring manor of Gierałtowice. Chudów is famous for its 16th-century Renaissance castle residence, built by the nobleman and scion John Saszowski von Geraltowitz (alias Geraltowsky in German, Gierałtowski in Polish). The village remained part of the House of Saszowski estates and a residence of its branch scions alias Geraltowsky von Geraltowitz (in Polish: Gierałtowski z Gieraltowic) until it was sold in the first half of the 17th century. Historical sources say, it was one of the most magnificent castle residences in Upper Silesia, host to many banquets and sport hunting activities of the aristocracy, in later times even included its own castle brewery and inn. The original entrance to the castle was via a drawbridge over the moat, which lead directly to the second floor of the castle tower.

In 1706 new owners of the castle was the family Foglarów. After 1768, the castle changed owners quite often, losing in importance. In 1837, the castle owner Alexander von Bally, made several reconstructions to the original design of the castle. The castle suffered severe fire damage in 1875, and its last owner left it as a picturesque ruin. Abandoned to ruin since the late 19th century, only parts of the walls, four-sided tower and outline of the moat survived to the present day. In 1995, the newly founded Chudów Castle Foundation, has since began gradual castle restoration and reconstruction work. Since 1966 the castle ruin is under registration No. A/568 categorized as of significant cultural value and tracked as objects of cultural heritage in Poland by the National Heritage Board of Poland.

In an already restored tower, there is a small museum that shows one of the most interesting exhibitions of ceramic medieval Gothic cocklestove tiles found in Poland, discovered on the castle grounds during restoration works and archaeological excavations.

Since 2000, the Chudów Castle Foundation organizes in August an annual medieval fair along with historical reenactments of medieval tournaments and warfare on Chudów castle grounds.

See also 
 Castles in Poland

External links

 Chudów Castle (Polish Zamek w Chudowie) (in Polish)
 Chudów Castle Foundation (in Polish)

References

Villages in Gliwice County
Ruined castles in Poland
Castles in Silesian Voivodeship
Tourist attractions in Poland
Tourist attractions in Silesian Voivodeship
Former castles in Poland